The 2020–21 Biathlon World Cup – Stage 7 was the 7th event of the season and was held in Antholz-Anterselva, Italy, from 21 to 24 January 2021.

Schedule of events 
The events took place at the following times.

Medal winners

Men

Women

Achievements 

 Best individual performance for all time
Not include World Championships and Olympic Games

 , 5th place in Individual
 , 13th place in Individual
 , 24th place in Individual
 , 36th place in Individual
 , 39th place in Individual
 , 41st place in Individual
 , 42nd place in Individual
 , 87th place in Individual
 , 92nd place in Individual
 , 1st place in Individual
 , 5th place in Individual
 , 10th place in Individual
 , 11th place in Individual
 , 26th place in Individual
 , 52nd place in Individual
 , 88th place in Individual
 , 90th place in Individual

 First individual World Cup race

 , 91st place in Individual
 , 96th place in Individual
 , 59th place in Individual

References 

2020–21 Biathlon World Cup
2021 in Italian sport
Biathlon World Cup - Stage 7
Biathlon competitions in Italy